In enzymology, an undecaprenyl-phosphate mannosyltransferase is an enzyme that catalyzes the chemical reaction

GDP-mannose + undecaprenyl phosphate  GDP + D-mannosyl-1-phosphoundecaprenol

Thus, the two substrates of this enzyme are GDP-mannose and undecaprenyl phosphate, whereas its two products are GDP and D-mannosyl-1-phosphoundecaprenol.

This enzyme belongs to the family of glycosyltransferases, specifically the hexosyltransferases.  The systematic name of this enzyme class is GDP-mannose:undecaprenyl-phosphate D-mannosyltransferase. Other names in common use include guanosine diphosphomannose-undecaprenyl phosphate, mannosyltransferase, GDP mannose-undecaprenyl phosphate mannosyltransferase, and GDP-D-mannose:lipid phosphate transmannosylase.  It employs one cofactor, phosphatidylglycerol.  Sources of this enzyme includes Micrococcus luteus, Phaseolus aureus,  Mycobacterium smegmatis and cotton fibers.

References

 

EC 2.4.1
Enzymes of unknown structure